The paradox of voting, also called Downs' paradox, is that for a rational, self-interested voter, the costs of voting will normally exceed the expected benefits.  Because the chance of exercising the pivotal vote is minuscule compared to any realistic estimate of the private individual benefits of the different possible outcomes, the expected benefits of voting are less than the costs.

Responses to the paradox have included the view that voters vote to express their preference for a candidate rather than affect the outcome of the election, that voters exercise some degree of altruism, or that the paradox ignores the collateral benefits associated with voting besides the resulting electoral outcome.

History of scholarship
The issue was noted by Nicolas de Condorcet in 1793 when he stated, "In single-stage elections, where there are a great many voters, each voter's influence is very small. It is therefore possible that the citizens will not be sufficiently interested [to vote]" and "... we know that this interest [which voters have in an election] must decrease with each individual's [i.e. voter's] influence on the election and as the number of voters increases."

In 1821, Hegel made a similar observation in his Elements of the Philosophy of Right: "As for popular suffrage, it may be further remarked that especially in large states it leads inevitably to electoral indifference, since the casting of a single vote is of no significance where there is a multitude of electors." 

The mathematician Charles L. Dodgson, better known as Lewis Carroll, published the paper "A Method of Taking Votes on More than Two Issues" in 1876.

This problem in modern public choice theory was analysed by Anthony Downs in 1957.

Responses
Alternative responses modify the postulate of egoistic rationality in various ways. For example, Geoffrey Brennan and Loren Lomasky suggest that voters derive "expressive" benefits from supporting particular candidates – analogous to cheering on a sports team – rather than voting in hopes of achieving the political outcomes they prefer. This implies that the rational behavior of voters is restricted to the instrumental as opposed to the intrinsic value they derive from their vote.

Another suggestion, known as the altruism theory of voting, is that voters are rational but not fully egoistic. In this view voters have some degree of altruism, and perceive a benefit if others are benefited. Since an election affects many others, it could still be rational to cast a vote with only a small chance of affecting the outcome.

Some argue that the paradox appears to ignore the collateral benefits associated with voting, besides affecting the outcome of the vote. For instance, magnitudes of electoral wins and losses are very closely watched by politicians, their aides, pundits and voters, because they indicate the strength of support for candidates, and tend to be viewed as  an inherently more accurate measure of such than mere opinion polls (which have to rely on imperfect sampling). Another argument that has been raised, is that researching who or what to vote for may increase the voter's political knowledge and community awareness, both of which may contribute to a general sense of civic duty, although in such a case the act of voting itself contributes nothing to this.

See also
 Fallacy of composition
 Homo economicus
 List of close election results
 Majoritarianism
 Rational ignorance
 Superrationality
 Voting system

References

Public choice theory
Elections
1957 introductions
Decision-making paradoxes
Voting theory